The Fethiye Mosque was an Ottoman mosque in Nafpaktos, Greece.

It was built in the orders of Sultan Bayezid II immediately after the capture of the city from the Venetians in 1499, and was the city's main mosque throughout the Ottoman period. It was also known after its founder as the Bayezid-i Veli Mosque. The mosque has been extensively restored and now functions as an exhibition hall.

See also
 Islam in Greece
 List of former mosques in Greece
 List of mosques in Greece

Ottoman mosques in Greece
15th-century mosques
Former mosques in Greece
Nafpaktos
Buildings and structures in Aetolia-Acarnania
15th-century architecture in Greece
Mosque buildings with domes